Sikalongo is a rural community in the Southern Province of Zambia.  It is located 30 km east-south-east of Choma in the Singani Chieftaincy, not far from the Zambezi Escarpment north-west of Lake Kariba.  It existed as a traditional community until the early twentieth century when American missionaries from the Brethren in Christ Church established a mission station there.  During the first half of the twentieth century, missionaries established a church, a clinic, and a primary school.  In 1968, the Brethren in Christ church established a Bible Institute which continues to the present.  With help from the local community, the mission station established a secondary school during the 1970s.

See also 
 Brethren in Christ
 Macha Mission Station

References 
 Engle, Anna R., J. A. Climenhaga and Leoda A. Buckwalter. There is No Difference, God Works in Africa and India. Nappanee, Ind.: E. V. Publishing House, 1950.
 Davidson, Hannah Frances. South and South Central Africa. Elgin, Ill.: Brethren Publishing House, 1915.
 Wittlinger, Carlton O. Quest for Piety and Obeidence: The Story of the Brethren in Christ. Nappanee, Ind.: Evangel Press, 1978.

External links 
 Sikalongo Bible Institute
 Brethren in Christ Church

Christian missions in Zambia
Populated places in Southern Province, Zambia